Gaëtan de Rosnay (17 May 1912 – 19 October 1992) was a French painter born in Mauritius, He belonged to the art movement called "La Jeune Peinture" ("young picture") of the School of Paris, with painters like Bernard Buffet, Yves Brayer, Louis Vuillermoz, Pierre-Henry, Daniel du Janerand, Maurice Boitel, Gaston Sébire, Paul Collomb,  Jean Monneret, Maurice Verdier.

From his Russian spouse Natalia, née Koltchine, he was the father of Zina, Joël (biologist and writer), Arnaud (1946–1984).

External links
  Virtual exhibit of Gaetan de Rosnay

1912 births
1990 deaths
20th-century French painters
20th-century French male artists
French male painters
French portrait painters
Modern painters
Mauritian emigrants to France